In enzymology, a linoleate isomerase is an enzyme that catalyzes the chemical reaction

9-cis,12-cis-octadecadienoate  9-cis,11-trans-octadecadienoate

Hence, this enzyme has one substrate, 9-cis,12-cis-octadecadienoate, and one product, 9-cis,11-trans-octadecadienoate.

This enzyme belongs to the family of isomerases, specifically cis-trans isomerases.  The systematic name of this enzyme class is linoleate Delta12-cis-Delta11-trans-isomerase. This enzyme is also called linoleic acid isomerase.  This enzyme participates in linoleic acid metabolism.

References

 

EC 5.2.1
Enzymes of unknown structure